Orthogonius aemulus is a species of ground beetle in the subfamily Orthogoniinae. It was described by Peringuey in 1896.

References

aemulus
Beetles described in 1896